This is a list of standalone video games that have been ported from a modification of another video game, and/or that are entirely based on a modification of another video game. A game is considered standalone when it does not require the purchase or installation of any other game (including separate engine software such as the Source SDK) in order to run.

List

See also
 List of game engines
 List of Source engine mods
 List of GoldSrc engine mods
 List of Unreal Engine games

References

Technology-related lists
Mod